Geoffrey Tillotson, FBA (30 June 1905 – 15 October 1969) was an English literary scholar and academic. He was Professor of English Literature at Birkbeck College, London, from 1944 to 1969. The son of a millworker, he attended Keighley Grammar School before reading English at Balliol College, Oxford, on a county scholarship (graduating with a BA in 1927 and the BLitt in 1930), after which worked briefly as a teacher before lecturing at University College London from 1931 to 1944. He was principally interested in the works of Alexander Pope and in 18th- and 19th-century literature and poetry (especially Victorian literature). Some of the work was carried out with his wife, the literary scholar Kathleen. He was elected a Fellow of the British Academy (FBA) in 1967.

References

Further reading 
 Mary Lascelles, "Geoffrey Tillotson, 1905–1969", Proceedings of the British Academy, vol. 56 (1970), pp. 351–362.

1905 births
1969 deaths
English literature academics
Alumni of Balliol College, Oxford
Academics of University College London
Academics of Birkbeck, University of London
Fellows of the British Academy